The 2021–22 season was Newcastle United's 129th year in their history and fifth consecutive season in the Premier League. Along with the league, the club also competed in the FA Cup and the EFL Cup. The season covers the period from 1 July 2021 to 30 June 2022.

Staff

Squad

Pre-season and friendlies
Newcastle United confirmed they would play friendly matches against York City, Doncaster Rovers, Rotherham United, Burton Albion, Burnley and Norwich City as part of their pre-season schedule.

Newcastle United were due to play Harrogate Town on 18 July 2021, it was originally decided that half of the first team players would go to the Harrogate Town match whilst the other half would go to the York City match but due to Karl Darlow receiving a positive COVID-19 test, it was decided that Newcastle United's first team would travel to the York City match and the Under-23's team would instead travel to the Harrogate Town match.

On 23 January 2022, Newcastle United announced that the first team squad would travel to Saudi Arabia for a week-long training camp. As part of that visit, it was also confirmed that Newcastle United would play a friendly match against Saudi Professional League side Al-Ittihad on 28 January 2022.

Competitions

Overall summary

Premier League

League table

Results summary

Results by matchday

Matches
The league fixtures were announced on 16 June 2021.

FA Cup

The Magpies were drawn at home to Cambridge United in the third round.

EFL Cup 

The Magpies were drawn at home to Burnley in the second round.

Transfers

Transfers in

Loans in

Loans out

Transfers out

Statistics

Appearances and goals
Last updated on 22 May 2022.

|-
! colspan=14 style=background:#dcdcdc; text-align:center| Goalkeepers

|-
! colspan=14 style=background:#dcdcdc; text-align:center| Defenders

|-
! colspan=14 style=background:#dcdcdc; text-align:center| Midfielders

}

|-
! colspan=14 style=background:#dcdcdc; text-align:center| Forwards

                                      
|-
! colspan=14 style=background:#dcdcdc; text-align:center| Player(s) who left on loan but featured this season

|}

Goals
Last updated on 22 May 2022.

Disciplinary record
Last updated on 8 May 2022.

Clean sheets
Last updated on 22 May 2022.

See also
 2021–22 in English football
 List of Newcastle United F.C. seasons

References

Newcastle United
Newcastle United F.C. seasons